The 1980 Auburn Tigers football team achieved an overall 5–6 record in their fifth year under head coach Doug Barfield and failed to win a single game in the SEC, losing all six games.  The team was also serving its second year of probation.

Auburn extended Doug Barfield's contract for the 1980 season.  However, no head coach lasts very long at Auburn without beating arch-rival Alabama, which he failed to do in five attempts; he was dismissed as head coach following the 1980 season.  During his tenure as head coach, Auburn "won 29 games in five seasons and produced 14 All-SEC and three All-American players."  Doug Barfield compiled an overall record of 29–25–1 (.536) as head coach of the Auburn Tigers.

Three players were named to the All-SEC first team for 1980: running back James Brooks, defensive tackle Frank Warren, and offensive tackle George Stephenson.

Schedule

Roster

References

Auburn
Auburn Tigers football seasons
Auburn Tigers football